Crystal Marie Fleming (born November 26, 1981) is an American sociologist and author. She is an associate professor of sociology and Africana studies at Stony Brook University. Fleming is the author of two books about race and white supremacy.

Early life and education 
Crystal Marie Fleming was born in Chattanooga, Tennessee. She was raised by her mother in a religious environment and her family belonged to a black Pentecostal church.

Fleming graduated in 2004, magna cum laude, with a Bachelor of Arts in sociology and French from Wellesley College. She completed a senior thesis titled Performing Blackness: Symbolic Boundaries and Aesthetic Distinctions among Spoken Word Poets in Boston. She obtained a Master of Arts in sociology in 2007 at Harvard University. At the same institution, Fleming earned a Doctor of Philosophy in sociology in 2011. Her dissertation was titled Imagining French Atlantic Slavery: A Comparison of Mnemonic Entrepreneurs and Everyday Antilleans in Metropolitan France. Fleming's doctoral advisor was Michèle Lamont. She won the 2012 Georges Lavau Dissertation Award from the American Political Science Association for an English-language dissertation on French politics.

Career 
Fleming is Associate Professor of Sociology, Africana Studies and Women's, Gender and Sexuality Studies at Stony Brook University. She was previously a visiting professor at Charles de Gaulle University – Lille III in 2015. She is the author of two books: Resurrecting Slavery: Racial Legacies and White Supremacy in France and How to Be Less Stupid About Race: On Racism, White Supremacy and the Racial Divide.

Personal life 
Fleming identifies as bisexual and queer.

Selected works

References

External links
 
 

1981 births
20th-century American women writers
21st-century American women writers
Living people
21st-century African-American writers
American women social scientists
Stony Brook University faculty
Wellesley College alumni
Harvard Graduate School of Arts and Sciences alumni
American women sociologists
Bisexual women
American LGBT writers
Bisexual academics
LGBT African Americans
LGBT people from Tennessee
Queer women
Queer writers
20th-century African-American women writers
20th-century African-American writers
21st-century African-American women writers
21st-century LGBT people